Spencer Papa (born 22 October 1995) is an American tennis player.

Papa has a career high ATP singles ranking of 858 achieved on 27 October 2014.

Papa made his ATP World Tour main draw debut at the 2017 US Open after receiving a wild card for the doubles tournament, partnering William Blumberg.

References

External links

1995 births
Living people
American male tennis players
Tennis people from Oklahoma
Oklahoma Sooners men's tennis players